Tarqui is an urban parish in Guayaquil Canton, Guayas, Ecuador, named after the Battle of Tarqui.
Tarqui is the largest and most populous parish in Guayaquil. It occupies the northern half of the city. At the 2001 census, the parish had a population of 835,486 inhabitants, 42.9% of the population in the city. Its southeastern portion belongs to the downtown.

Importance
The importance of this parish is due to its massive population and area. Most universities are located in its territory. Other important places include the José Joaquín de Olmedo International Airport and the Rafael Mendoza Avilés Bridge, which connects the city with Durán and major cities of the country.

Guayaquil
Parishes of Ecuador